Jennifer Elizabeth Copnall, (born 19 November 1975, Barnet) is a former professional racing cyclist from North Marston, specialising in cross country and marathon mountain bike racing, and is a multiple national champion. She also represented England at the 2002 Commonwealth Games in Manchester.

Palmarès

1996
3rd XC, British National Mountain Biking Championships
3rd in Final stage of Mtb Tour of Britain

1998
2nd XC, British National Mountain Biking Championships
22nd UCI World Cup Round 5, Plymouth

1999
3rd XC, British National Mountain Biking Championships

2001
3rd XC, British National Mountain Biking Championships
30th Overall World Cup Mountain Bike Series

2002
3rd XC, British National Mountain Biking Championships
30th Overall, Mtb World Cup Series

2003
1st  XC, British National Mountain Biking Championships
1st Overall, XC National Points Series
25th European Mountain Biking Championships

2004
2nd XC, British National Mountain Biking Championships
1st Overall, XC National Points Series
44th World Championships

2005
1st  XC, British National Mountain Biking Championships
1st Overall, XC National Points Series

2006
1st  XC, British National Mountain Biking Championships
1st  Marathon, British National Mountain Biking Championships
1st Overall, XC National Points Series
1st Round 1, Sherwood Pines
1st Round 2, Margam Park
1st Round 3, Drumlanrig Castle
1st Round 4, Plymouth
1st Round 5, Checkendon

2007
1st  XC, British National Mountain Biking Championships
18th World Marathon Championships

2008
1st XC, British National Mountain Biking Championships
1st Overall, XC, British National Points Series

2009
2nd XC British National Mountain Biking Championship

References

External links
Jenny Copnall Exclusive Interview, British Cycling, 2007
 Sporting Champions profile
Putting the wheels in motion, BBC Essex, 20 October 2007
SheCycles interviews XC racer Jenny Copnall, 24 May 2006

1975 births
Living people
Cross-country mountain bikers
Marathon mountain bikers
Cyclists at the 2002 Commonwealth Games
Commonwealth Games competitors for England
English female cyclists
People from Chipping Barnet